Antispila argentifera is a moth of the family Heliozelidae. It was described by Annette Frances Braun in 1927. It is found in North America, including Ontario.

The larvae feed on birch species. They mine the leaves of their host plant.

References

Moths described in 1927
Heliozelidae